Hari Om is a Hindu mantra. Similar to the sacred mantra Om, Hari Om is chanted by adherents during the beginning of auspicious activities or during meditation. It is also employed as a greeting.

Description 
Hari is an epithet of the Hindu deity Vishnu, who is the addressee of this mantra. 

According to the Agni Purana, remembering the name of Hari is described to cause the expiation of a person who has committed a sin, and the repetition of the mantra Om is stated to offer the same result. 

It is regarded to be allow the chanter to achieve moksha.

References 

Hindu mantras
Om mantras
Mantras